Alexandre Camarasa (born 10 June 1987) is a French water polo player. He competed in the men's tournament at the 2016 Summer Olympics.

References

External links
 

1987 births
Living people
French male water polo players
Olympic water polo players of France
Water polo players at the 2016 Summer Olympics
Water polo players from Marseille
Competitors at the 2013 Mediterranean Games
Mediterranean Games competitors for France